The areca nut ( or ) is the fruit of the areca palm (Areca catechu), which grows in much of the tropical Pacific (Melanesia and Micronesia), South Asia, Southeast Asia, and parts of east Africa. It is commonly referred to as betel nut, not to be confused with betel (Piper betle) leaves that are often used to wrap it (a preparation known as betel nut chewing). Consumption has many harmful effects on health and is carcinogenic to humans. Various compounds present in the nut, including arecoline (the primary psychoactive ingredient which is similar to nicotine), contribute to histologic changes in the oral mucosa. It is known to be a major risk factor for cancers (squamous cell carcinoma) of the mouth and esophagus. As with chewing tobacco, its use is discouraged by preventive efforts. Consumption by hundreds of millions of people worldwide – mainly of South Asian or Southeast Asian origins – has been described as a "neglected global public health emergency".

Etymology
The term areca originated from Dravidian languages, cognates of which are:

 
The terms dates back to the 16th century when Dutch and Portuguese sailors took the nut from India to Europe.

It is also known as Elaus in Palau.

Description 

The areca nut is not a true nut, but rather the seed of a fruit categorized as a berry. It is commercially available in dried, cured, and fresh forms. When the husk of the fresh fruit is green, the nut inside is soft enough to be cut with a typical knife. In the ripe fruit, the husk becomes yellow or orange, and as it dries, the fruit inside hardens to a wood-like consistency. At that stage, the areca nut can only be sliced using a special scissors-like cutter.

Usually for chewing, a few slices of the nut are wrapped in a betel leaf along with calcium hydroxide (slaked lime) and may include clove, cardamom, catechu (kattha), or other spices for extra flavouring. Betel leaf has a fresh, peppery taste, but it can also be bitter to varying degrees depending on the variety.

Areca nuts are chewed with betel leaf for their effects as a mild stimulant, causing a warming sensation in the body and slightly heightened alertness, although the effects vary from person to person.

The areca nut contains the tannins arecatannin and gallic acid; a fixed oil gum; a little terpineol; lignin; various saline substances; and three main alkaloids—arecoline, arecaidine, and guvacine—all of which have vasoconstricting properties. The betel leaf chewed along with the nut contains eugenol, another vasoconstrictor. Tobacco leaf is often added to the mixture, thereby adding the effect of nicotine.

In parts of India, Sri Lanka, and southern China, areca nuts are not only chewed along with betel leaf, but are also used in the preparation of Ayurvedic and traditional Chinese medicines. Powdered areca nut is used as a constituent in some dentifrices. Other traditional uses include the removal of tapeworms and other intestinal parasites by swallowing a few teaspoons of powdered areca nut, drunk as a decoction, or by taking tablets containing the extracted alkaloids. According to traditional Ayurvedic medicine, chewing areca nut and betel leaf is a good remedy against bad breath. Diplomat Edmund Roberts noted that Chinese people would mix areca nut with Uncaria gambir during his visit to China in the 1830s. After chewing a betelnut, the red residue is generally spat out. Accordingly, places have banned chewing this nut to avoid eyesores.

Health effects 

Habitual chewers of betel leaf and areca nut have a greatly increased risk of developing a range of serious diseases, including cancers of the mouth and esophagus. It has many systemic effects (see box).

Chewing areca nut is a cause of oral submucous fibrosis, a premalignant lesion which frequently progresses to mouth cancer. According to Medline Plus, "Long-term use [of betel-areca preparations] has been associated with oral submucosal fibrosis (OSF), pre-cancerous oral lesions and squamous cell carcinoma. Acute effects of betel chewing include asthma exacerbation, hypertension, and tachycardia. There may additionally be a higher risk of cancers of the liver, mouth, esophagus, stomach, prostate, cervix, and lung with regular betel use. Other effects can include altered blood sugar levels, which may in turn increase the risk of developing type 2 diabetes."

Use of areca nut has been associated with deterioration of psychosis in people with preexisting psychiatric disorders . Areca nut consumption is also tied to chronic kidney disease in men as well as reports of milk-alkali syndrome.

In 2003 the International Agency for Research on Cancer (IARC), a World Health Organization sponsored group, found sufficient evidence that the habit of chewing betel quid, with or without tobacco, causes cancer in humans. In October 2009, 30 scientists from 10 countries met at IARC to reassess the carcinogenicity of various agents including areca nut, and mechanisms of carcinogenesis. They confirmed there is sufficient evidence that areca nut, with or without tobacco, can cause cancer.

The harm caused by consumption of betel quid or areca nut by hundreds of millions of people worldwide (mainly with southern and eastern Asian origins and connections) has been characterized as a "neglected global public health emergency".

During pregnancy 
Chewing paan (or other areca nut and betel leaf formulations) during pregnancy significantly increases adverse outcomes for the baby. The habit is associated with higher incidences of preterm birth and low birth weight and height. Biologically, these effects may be a consequence of the arecoline that is found in areca nuts. The habit also exposes the fetus to various other toxic components linked to cancer.

Chemical composition 
The major alkaloid in betel nut is arecoline. There are other compounds, such as arecaidine, guvacine, isoguvacine, and guvacoline. Tannins present in betel nut are mainly proanthocyanidins along with catechins and arecatannin. Two new alkaloids were recently discovered and named acatechu A and acatechu B. Several non-alkaloid compounds including benzenoids, terpenes, acids, aldehydes, alcohols, and esters were also  identified.

Tradition 

The oldest unequivocal evidence of betel chewing is from the Philippines. Specifically that of several individuals found in a burial pit in the Duyong Cave site of Palawan island dated to around 2680±250 BCE. The dentition of the skeletons is stained, typical of betel chewers. The grave also includes Anadara shells used as containers of lime, one of which still contained lime. Burial sites in Bohol dated to the first millennium CE also show the distinctive reddish stains characteristic of betel chewing. Based on linguistic evidence of how the reconstructed Proto-Austronesian term *buaq originally meaning "fruit" came to refer to "areca nut" in Proto-Malayo-Polynesian, it is believed that betel chewing originally developed somewhere within the Philippines shortly after the beginning of the Austronesian expansion (~3000 BCE). From the Philippines, it spread back to Taiwan, as well as onwards to the rest of Austronesia and in neighboring cultures through trade and migration.

Chewing the mixture of areca nut and betel leaf constitutes an important and popular cultural activity in many South Asian, Southeast Asian, East Asian and Oceanic countries. How or when the areca nut and the betel leaf were first combined into one psychoactive drug is not known. Archaeological evidence from Thailand, Indonesia, and the Philippines suggests they have been used in tandem for at least 4000 years.

In Vietnam, the areca nut and the betel leaf are such important symbols of love and marriage that in Vietnamese the phrase "matters of betel and areca" (chuyện trầu cau) is synonymous with marriage.  The tradition of chewing areca nuts starts the talk between the groom's parents and the bride's parents about the young couple's marriage. Therefore, the leaves and juices are used ceremonially in Vietnamese weddings. The folk tale explaining the origin of this Vietnamese tradition is a good illustration of the belief that the combination of areca nut and the betel leaf is ideal to the point they are practically inseparable, like an idealized married couple.

Formerly, in both India and Sri Lanka, it was a custom of the royalty to chew areca nut with betel leaf. Kings had special attendants whose duty it was to carry a box with all the necessary ingredients for a good chewing session. There was also a custom for lovers to chew areca nut and betel leaf together, because of its breath-freshening and relaxant properties. A sexual symbolism thus became attached to the chewing of the nut and the leaf. The areca nut represented the male principle, and the betel leaf the female principle. Considered an auspicious ingredient in Hinduism and some schools of Buddhism, the areca nut is still used along with betel leaf in religious ceremonies, and also while honoring individuals in much of southern Asia.

In Assam, as well as most of its neighbouring Northeastern states, Areca Nut is preferably consumed in its fermented form, which is supposed to make the fruit harder and sweeter. The raw nut may also be eaten during certain seasons when the fermented variety becomes unavailable, although it has more of ritual importance. Standard sized pieces of the nut and leaf are usually consumed in combination with lime and a bit of tobacco. In Assam, betel nut and leaf has indispensable cultural value; offering betel leaf and nut, (together known as gua) constitutes a part of social greeting and socialising. It is a tradition to offer pan-tamul (betel leaves and raw areca nut) to guests immediately upon arrival, and after tea or meals, served in a brass plate with stands called  bota. In traditional Assamese societies carrying a pouch of tamul-pan upon one's person during journeys or during farming activities, and sharing of the same, was an essential requirement. Among the Assamese, the areca nut also has a variety of uses during religious and marriage ceremonies, where it has the role of a fertility symbol. No religious ritual is complete without the offering of tamul-pan to the gods and spirits as well as to the assembled guests  A tradition from Upper Assam is to invite guests to wedding receptions by offering a few areca nuts with betel leaves. During Bihu, the husori players are offered areca nuts and betel leaves by each household while their blessings are solicited.

Spanish mariner Álvaro de Mendaña reported observing Solomon Islanders chewing the nut and the leaf with caustic lime, and the manner in which the habit stained their mouths red. He noted the friendly and genial chief Malope, on Santa Isabel Island, would offer him the combination as a token of friendship every time they met.

In Bhutan, the areca nut is called doma. The soft and moist raw areca nut is very potent. When chewed it can cause palpitation and vasoconstriction. This form is eaten in the lower regions of Bhutan and in North Bengal, where the nut is cut into half and put into a local paan leaf with a generous amount of lime. In the rest of Bhutan the raw nut, with the husk on, is fermented such that the husk rots and is easy to extract. The fermented doma has a putrid odour, which can be smelled from miles. Traditionally, this fragrant nut is cut in half and placed on top of a cone made of local betel leaf, which has a dash of lime put into it. "Myth has it that the inhabitants of Bhutan traditionally known as Monyul, the land of Monpas where Buddhism did not reach lived on raw flesh, drank blood, and chewed bones. After the arrival of Guru Rinpoche in the eighth century, he stopped the people from eating flesh and drinking blood and created a substitute which is betel leaf, lime and areca nut. Today, chewing doma has become a custom. Doma is served after meals, during rituals and ceremonies. It is offered to friends and is chewed at work places by all sections of society and has become an essential part of Bhutanese life and culture."

In Indonesia, the areca nut is called pinang.

The addition of tobacco leaf to the chewing mixture is a relatively recent innovation, as tobacco was not introduced from the American continent until the colonial era.

Modern-day consumption 

In India (the largest consumer of areca nut) and the rest of the Indian subcontinent, the preparation of nut with or without betel leaf is commonly referred to as paan. It is available practically everywhere and is sold in ready-to-chew pouches called pan masala or supari, which is the dried form of the Areca Nut, as a mixture of many flavours whose primary base is dried areca nut crushed into small pieces. Poor people, who may eat only every other day, use it to stave off hunger pangs. Pan masala with a small quantity of tobacco is called gutka. The easily discarded, small plastic supari or gutka pouches are a ubiquitous pollutant of the South Asian environment. Some of the liquid in the mouth is usually disposed of by spitting, producing bright red spots wherever the expectorate lands.

In the Maldives, areca nut chewing is very popular, but spitting is frowned upon and regarded as an unrefined, repulsive way of chewing. Usually, people prefer to chew thin slices of the dry nut, which is sometimes roasted. Kili, a mixture of areca nut, betel, cloves, cardamom and sugar is sold in small home-made paper pouches. Old people who have lost their teeth keep "chewing" by pounding the mixture of areca nut and betel with a small mortar and pestle.

In Papua New Guinea and the Solomon Islands, fresh areca nut, betel leaf or 'fruit leaf' (daka in the former) and lime are sold on street corners.  In these countries, dried or flavoured areca nut is not popular.  Betelnuts there are referred to in Tok Pisin as buai. There has recently been a controversial ban on selling and chewing betelnut in public places in Port Moresby. Because of this, many people have tried to smuggle betelnut into Port Moresby. Notably, there was a raid in Hanuabada in May 2015 where several bags of betelnut were confiscated, the total value of the confiscated nuts exceeding US$180,000. Areca nut chewing has recently been introduced into Vanuatu, where it is growing in popularity, especially in the northern islands of the country.
In Guam and the neighboring Northern Mariana Islands, betel and areca nut chewing is a social pastime as a means to extend friendship, and can be found in many, if not most, large gatherings as part of the food display.

In Palau, betel nut is chewed with lime, piper leaf and nowadays, with the addition of tobacco. Older and younger generations alike enjoy the use of betel nut, which is readily available at stores and markets. Unlike in Papua New Guinea and the Solomon Islands, where the inner areca nut is used, in Palau, the areca nut's skin is chewed along with lime, leaf and tobacco and the juice is not swallowed but spat out.

In Taiwan, bags of 20 to 40 areca nuts are purchased fresh daily by a large number of consumers. To meet the steady year-round demand, two kinds of betel-nut shops sell betel and nuts, as well as cigarettes and drinks, including beer: Small mom and pop shops, often poorly maintained and with unassuming façades, and shops which will often consist of nothing more than a single, free-standing room, or booth. The latter is usually elevated one meter above the street, and measures less than 3 by 2 m. Large picture windows comprise two or more of the walls, allowing those who pass by a complete view of the interior. The interior is often painted brightly. Within such a shop, a sexily dressed young woman, a "betel nut beauty", can be seen preparing betel and areca nuts. Shops are often identified by multicoloured (commonly green) fluorescent tubes or neon lights that frame the windows or that are arranged radially above a store. Customers stop on the side of the road and wait for the girls to bring their betel and areca nut to their vehicles. The habit of chewing betel nut is often associated with blue-collar labor industries such a long-haul transportation, construction, or fishing. Workers in these labor-intensive industries use betel nut for its stimulating effect, but it also becomes a tool for socializing with coworkers. For example, studies have shown chewing betel nut is prevalent among taxi, bus and truck drivers, who rely on the stimulating effect of betel nut to cope with long work hours. For these reasons, oral cancer has been identified as a leading cause of death in professions with high betel nut-chewing rates.

In Hainan and Hunan Province, China, where Xiangtan is a center of use and processing, a wide range of old and young people consume areca nut daily. Most, though, consume the dried variety of the nut by itself, without the betel leaves. Some people also consume the areca nut in its raw, fresh form with or without the betel leaves. Betel nuts are sold mostly by old women walking around trying to sell it, but the dried version can be found in most shops that sell tea, alcohol, and cigarettes.

In Thailand, the consumption of areca nut has declined gradually in the last decades. The younger generation rarely chews the substance, especially in the cities. Most of the present-day consumption is confined to older generations, mostly people above 50. Even so, small trays of betel leaves and sliced tender areca nut are sold in markets and used as offerings in Buddhist shrines.

In Australia, the importation, use, and sale of areca nut are prohibited.

In the Philippines, chewing the areca nut and betel leaf was a very widespread tradition in the past. Now, though, this tradition is almost dead among the urban people in the cities and big towns, and has largely been replaced by gum and tobacco. Nowadays, older people are the only ones chewing betel nuts. But in rural areas, betel nut chewing is very much alive.

In the United States, areca nut is not a controlled or specially taxed substance and may be found in some Asian grocery stores. However, importation of areca nut in a form other than whole or carved kernels of nuts can be stopped at the discretion of US Customs officers on the grounds of food, agricultural, or medicinal drug violations. Such actions by Customs are very rare.

In the United Kingdom, areca nut is readily available.

Possession of betel nut or leaf is banned in the UAE and is a punishable offense.

Places such as Guwahati (গুৱাহাটী) in India, Penang in Malaysia, Ko Mak (เกาะหมาก) in Thailand, Fua Mulaku in Maldives and Binlang Islet in Taiwan have been named after the areca nut.

Initiation of areca nut consumption appears to depend on complex psychosocial factors.

Production 

In 2017, world production of areca nut was 1.3 million tonnes, with India providing 54% of the total. As other leading producers, Myanmar, Indonesia, Bangladesh and Taiwan combined contributed 38% of the world total (table).

See also 
 List of herbs with known adverse effects

References 

Herbal and fungal stimulants
Edible nuts and seeds
Edible palms
Fruit trees
IARC Group 1 carcinogens
Flora of the Maldives
Medicinal plants of Asia
Euphoriants